Élise Garel , known as "Lili", (5 July 1921, Paris9 November 2013, Paris) was a French Jewish resistance fighter who, with her husband Georges Garel, saved many Jewish children during the Shoah.

Biography
Élise Tager was born in 1921 in Paris.

Her parents were Russian Jews who emigrated to France in 1919. She participated in the Demonstration of 11 November 1940 of high school and college students at Place de l'Étoile and was imprisoned as a Jew for three months in Fresnes Prison. She took refuge in Lyon at the end of 1941.

Resistant
Lili Garel, as a courier between Nice and Lyon, participated in the rescue of Jewish children, with her husband, Georges Garel. After the war, Georges Garel became firstly director general, then president of l'Œuvre de secours aux enfants (OSE).

Her resistance name was Elisabeth-Jeanne Tissier.

She was imprisoned at Fort Montluc in Lyon.

During the 'night of Vénissieux' (August 28–29, 1943), 108 Jewish children and 80 adults were taken out of the internment camp in Vénissieux (Lyon metropolitan area) and saved from deportation. Shortly after this event, in 1943, Lili Tager and Georges Garel married. Vénissieux marked the beginning of Georges Garel's action in the field with the OSE, until then he had been an engineer in Lyon, and it was also Lili Tager's first involvement in the field. At 20 years of age, she had just been hired in the OSE office in Lyon, as a part-time secretary and as a social worker. Years later, she had not forgotten the "nightmare" of Vénissieux.

Memoirs of Georges Garel
As Katy Hazan notes in the preface to Georges Garel's book, this work was published with the "tenacious will" of Lili Garel.

Family
Georges and Lise Garel had seven children: Jean-Renaud, polytechnician and biochemist; Anne, doctor; Michel, curator of Hebrew manuscripts at the National Library of France; Laurent, doctor; Thomas, normalien and physicist; Denis, doctor; and Nathalie, publicist.

Georges Garel died in 1979.

Lili Garel died in Paris on 9 November 2013, at the age of 93.

Honours
Honoured at the United States Holocaust Memorial Museum in Washington, D.C., in November 2000.
The headquarters of the Children's Aid Work (OSE) at 11 Rue du Faubourg-du-Temple in Paris, until then known as the 'Centre Georges Garel', became the 'Centre Georges and Lili Garel', on 23 June 2014.

Film
Historian Valérie Perthuis-Portheret made a film which chronicles the life of Lili Garel, and in particular her role in the 'night of Vénissieux.

Bibliography
Deborah Dwork, Children with a Star: Jewish Youth in Nazi Europe. Yale University Press, 1993. , 
Valérie Perthuis, Le sauvetage des enfants juifs du camp de Vénissieux : août 1942, (tr. "The Rescue of Jewish Children from the Vénissieux Camp: August 19422), Lyon, Editions lyonnaises d'art et d'histoire, 1997, 126 p.
Deborah Dwork & Robert Jan Pelt. Holocaust: A History. W.W. Norton & Company, 2002. , 
Georges Garel. Le sauvetage des enfants juifs par l'OSE. (tr. "The rescue of Jewish children by the OSE"). Editions Le Manuscrit, 2012. ,

References

1921 births
2013 deaths
Jews in the French resistance
Russian Jews